Philbertia shaskyi is a species of sea snail, a marine gastropod mollusk in the family Raphitomidae.

Description

Distribution
This marine species occurs off Baja California, Mexico

References

External links
 Gastropods.com: Raphitoma (Raphitoma) shaskyi

Raphitomidae
Gastropods described in 1971